HMS Ambuscade was a 32-gun fifth-rate frigate of the Royal Navy, built in the Grove Street shipyard of Adams & Barnard at Depford in 1773. The French captured her in 1798 but the British recaptured her in 1803. She was broken up in 1810.

American Revolution
On 19 May 1778 she recaptured brig Mary. On 31 May 1778 she captured American brig "Charming Sally" near Cape Sambro.

On 22 June 1779, after a short action, Ambuscade captured the French brig Hélene, which was the former Royal Navy 14-gun sloop . The Royal Navy took her back into service under her original name. Six days later Ambuscade captured the French privateer Prince de Montbray. The privateer was possibly out of Granville and under the command of Captain Boisnard-Maisonneuve.

 captured the "private man of war" Américaine on 26 January 1781. She was armed with 32 guns and carried a crew of 245. Ambuscade shared in the proceeds of the capture.

French Revolutionary Wars
Circa June 1797, in the Caribbean, Ambuscade captured the 32-ton, 3-gun privateer cutter Buonaparte, from Saint-Malo. She had a crew of 32 men under Captain F. Roussel.

On 13 December 1798, Ambuscade captured a French merchantman, Faucon, with a cargo of sugar and coffee bound for Bordeaux.

Disaster struck the following day. Ambuscade was blockading Rochefort, when the smaller French corvette  captured her at the action of 14 December 1798. The court martial exonerated Captain Henry Jenkins of Ambuscade, though a good case could be made that he exhibited poor leadership and ship handling. The French brought her into service as Embuscade.

Napoleonic Wars

On 28 May 1803,  recaptured her. She had a crew of 187 men under the command of capitaine de vaisseau Fradin, and was 30 days out of Cap Francais, bound for Rochefort. The Royal Navy took her back into service as Ambuscade.

In March 1805, she was attached to Sir James Craig's military expedition to Italy.

On 4 March 1807, Ambuscade captured the ship Istria.

Fate
Ambuscade was broken up in 1810.

Notes, citations, and references
Notes

Citations

References
       
 
 
 
 
 Wareham, Tom (2001) The star captains: frigate command in the Napoleonic Wars. (Annapolis, Md. Naval Inst. Press). 
 Michael Phillips' ships of the old Navy
 Naval history of Great Britain , by William James

External links
 

Frigates of the Royal Navy
Age of Sail frigates of France
Ships built in Deptford
1773 ships
Frigates of the French Navy
Captured ships